Barry Jackson (29 March 1938 – 5 December 2013) was an English stage, film and television actor.

Career
His film career included roles in Ryan's Daughter, Barry Lyndon, Aces High, The Raging Moon, Mr. Love, and Wimbledon.

His television credits included: A for Andromeda, The Mask of Janus, Adam Adamant Lives!, Doctor Who, Z-Cars, Dixon of Dock Green, Special Branch, The Troubleshooters, Man at the Top, Doomwatch, Public Eye, Poldark, Oil Strike North, The New Avengers, Blake's 7, The Professionals, Coronation Street, Enemy at the Door, All Creatures Great and Small, Minder, Bergerac, Lovejoy, Casualty, Peak Practice, Silent Witness, Kavanagh QC, The Bill, A Touch of Frost, Holby City, Heartbeat and Midsomer Murders.

Jackson appeared in Doctor Who in the show's original run, including the stories The Romans and in the episode Mission to the Unknown. Jackson also returned to the show and played "Drax," a school chum of the Doctor, in the Fourth Doctor story The Armageddon Factor. In 1977 he appeared as a Lock-Keeper in the Secret Army episode Identity in Doubt. This was followed in 1980 by his appearance as farmer Ken Billings in the All Creatures Great and Small episode, Matters of Lide and Death. Jackson later played another Yorkshire farmer, Jim Hobson, in the Heartbeat episode, Risky Business.

He appeared in the first fourteen series of Midsomer Murders as Dr George Bullard, the pathologist, although he did not appear in series two. The character outlasted the show's original lead, DCI Tom Barnaby, by one season.

Death
He died in London on 5 December 2013, aged 75, from cancer.

Filmography

References

External links
 
Obituary at The Guardian

1938 births
2013 deaths
English male film actors
English male television actors
Deaths from cancer in England
Male actors from Birmingham, West Midlands
20th-century English male actors
21st-century English male actors
Alumni of the London Academy of Music and Dramatic Art